Bus doors are of various types of buses with doors including conventional doors, folding doors, sliding plug doors, coach doors and inward gliding doors.

Conventional door 

A conventional door, also known as a regular door or vehicle door is a type of door that is hinged at the front-facing edge of the door, and so allows the door to swing outward from the hull of the bus. These doors are relatively safe, in that if they are opened during forward motion of the vehicle, the wind resistance will work against the opening door, and will effectively force its closure.

Folding doors 

A folding door can have an electric folding door mechanism or manually operated. It is widely used on some older model city buses, mini-buses and school buses that have no air sources.
Its features a whole frame design which can give it superior performance and excellent durability.
It can be used in extremely hot and cold climates.

Sliding plug doors 

Sliding plug doors open by sliding horizontally, whereby the door is either mounted on, or suspended from a track. They are also used on commercial vans, trains and other vehicles. They allow a large opening for passengers to enter or exit without obstructing access.

Coach doors

Inward sliding doors 

Inward sliding doors combine rotary and linear movements to slide the door wings to the side of the doorway as they open.

See also 
 Sliding door (car)

References 

Bus terminology
Vehicle doors